Elachista tengstromi is a moth of the family Elachistidae found in Europe and Japan. The moth was formerly considered to be a form of Elachista regificella.

Description

The larvae feed on hairy wood-rush (Luzula pilosa). They form a strongly contracted upper-surface tentiform mine, generally in the lower third of the leaf, beginning at the leaf base. Mostly, a second or third mine is made which starts at the leaf tip. Pupation takes place outside of the mine.

Distribution
It is found from Fennoscandia to Switzerland and Austria, and from Great Britain to Poland. It is also found in Japan.

References

External links
 Lepidoptera of Sweden

tengstromi
Leaf miners
Moths described in 2001
Moths of Europe
Moths of Japan
Taxa named by Lauri Kaila